There are 60 members of the 26th Seanad Éireann, the upper house of the Oireachtas (Irish parliament). Of these, 49 were elected on a restricted franchise, polls closing on 30–31 March 2020; subsequently the remaining 11 members were nominated by the Taoiseach, Micheál Martin, on 27 June 2020.

The government has a clear majority (40 to 20) in the Seanad.

Of the 60 members, twenty-four (40%) are women, and thirty (50%) are first-time Senators. Five Senators (8%) are members of the LGBT+ community. 

33 members (55%) of the 26th Seanad were unsuccessful candidates at the 2020 general election, 10 of those (17%) being outgoing TDs who failed to get re-elected. In total 41 members (68%) of the 26th Seanad had contested general elections in the past, while 15 (25%) were former TDs.

Eileen Flynn is the first Irish Traveller to be a member of the Seanad.

Senator Mark Daly was elected as Cathaoirleach at the opening of the term, and Senator Jerry Buttimer as Leas Cathaoirleach. As part of a power sharing deal between Fianna Fáil, Fine Gael and the Green Party, Jerry Buttimer replaced Daly as Cathaoirleach on 16 December 2022, with Daly taking up the  Leas Cathaoirleach role. The political leadership of the Seanad also swapped on 16 December 2022, with outgoing Leader of the Seanad, Regina Doherty becoming Deputy Leader, and outgoing Deputy Leader Lisa Chambers becoming Leader. Outgoing Government Chief Whip of the Seanad, Senator Sean Kyne of Fine Gael also swapped positions with Seanad Government Deputy Chief Whip Senator Robbie Gallagher, who took over as Seanad Chief Whip.

The leadership of the Green Party group in the Seanad also changed with Senator Pauline O'Reilly stepping down as Group leader to be replaced by Senator Róisín Garvey. 

This swap in Seanad leadership coincided with the swap in roles of Taoiseach and Tánaiste on 17 December, for the second half of the current Dail/Seanad term.

Electoral system
There are 60 seats in the Seanad: 43 Senators are elected by the Vocational panels, six elected by the two University constituencies, and eleven are nominated by the Taoiseach. Three seats are elected by graduates of the four colleges of the National University of Ireland (University College Cork, University College Dublin, University of Galway and Maynooth University) and three seats are elected by graduates of University of Dublin (as Trinity College Dublin is the sole constituent college, this is often referred to as the Trinity College constituency).

Article 18.8 of the Constitution requires that an election for Seanad Éireann must take place not later than 90 days after a dissolution of the Dáil. On 21 January, Minister for Housing, Planning and Local Government Eoghan Murphy signed the orders for the Seanad election.

Timetable
24 February 2020: deadline for proposals for nominations to the vocational panels by nominating bodies (civic society groups)
2 March 2020: deadline for proposals for nominations to the vocational panels by Members of the Oireachtas (President of Ireland, TDs and Senators)
9 March 2020: Seanad Returning Officer completes the panels of candidates
16 March 2020: postal balloting begins
30 March 2020, 11 a.m.: polling closes for the five special panels, counting of votes commences
31 March 2020, 11 a.m.: polling closes in the two university constituencies  
27 June 2020: Taoiseach's nominees announced

Composition of the 26th Seanad

Government parties denoted with bullets

List of senators

Changes

See also
Members of the 33rd Dáil
Government of the 33rd Dáil

References

External links
How the Seanad is Elected – Department of Housing, Local Government and Heritage

 
26